Lemaireia is a genus of moths from the family Saturniidae, commonly known as moon moths.

Small oriental genus consisting of 8 orange-marked yellow species, reviewed by Nassig & Holloway (in press). Diagnostic features are: uniformity, rather than asymmetry, of the rings of the ocelli; an undivided, dorsally domed uncus in the male genitalia; a short broad aedeagus with two apical fields of scobination, and a densely and robustly scobinate apex to the conical vesica; strong pouches lateral to the ostium in the female genitalia; a signum consisting of a single spine in the bursa copulatrix.

Species
Lemaireia chrysopeplus (Toxopeus, 1940)
Lemaireia hainana Naessig & Wang, 2006
Lemaireia inexpectata Naessig, 1996
Lemaireia loepoides (Butler, 1880)
Lemaireia luteopeplus Naessig & Holloway, 1988
Lemaireia naessigi Brechlin, 2001
Lemaireia schintlmeisteri Naessig & Lampe, 1989

References
 Barcode of Life Data Systems (BOLD)

Saturniinae